Symonenko is a gender-neutral Ukrainian language surname, derived from the given name Symon. Notable people with the surname include:

 Alexander Symonenko (born 1974), Ukrainian track cyclist
 Oleksiy Symonenko (born 1976), Ukrainian lawyer
 Petro Symonenko (born 1952), Ukrainian politician and the First Secretary of the Communist Party of Ukraine
 Serhiy Symonenko (born 1981), Ukrainian footballer
 Valentyn Symonenko (born 1940), Ukrainian politician and former acting prime minister
 Vasyl Symonenko (1935–1963), Ukrainian poet

Patronymic surnames
Ukrainian-language surnames